Yaprykovo (Yaprıq) is a rural locality (a selo) in Ilchimbetovsky Selsoviet, Tuymazinsky District, Bashkortostan, Russia. The population was 755 as of 2010. There are 13 streets.

Geography 
Yaprykovo is located 14 km west of Tuymazy (the district's administrative centre) by road. Baylarovo is the nearest rural locality.

References 

Rural localities in Tuymazinsky District